Say Hi to Pencil! (Vietnamese : Xin chào Bút Chì !) is a 2011 Vietnamese clay animation comedy film produced by the group SleepingCatFilm.

Directed and written 
Directed and written by: Phuong Anh Pham, Thanh Hynh, Huynh Thanh Thanh.
Sound: Huu tuan nguyen .

References

External links
 Xin chào Bút Chì cực teen, cực cute !
 Ấn tượng với Xin chào Bút Chì - Thanh Niên Online // 13-8-2011 (16:31)
 Đôi bạn mê phim

Vietnamese animated television series
2011 comedy films
Vietnamese computer-animated films
Vietnamese children's films
Films about toys
2011 animated films
2011 films
2010s animated short films